Mayetta is an unincorporated community located within Stafford Township, in Ocean County, New Jersey, United States. U.S. Route 9 is a major highway that travels through Mayetta.

Notable people
 Martin Truex Sr. (born 1948), former driver who competed in the Busch North Series.
 Martin Truex Jr. (born 1980), a NASCAR Cup Series driver who currently pilots Joe Gibbs Racing's #19 Toyota Camry and is the 2017 Monster Energy NASCAR Cup Series champion.
 Ryan Truex (born 1992), a NASCAR Camping World Truck Series driver who currently pilots Niece Motorsports's #40 Chevrolet Silverado full-time, having previously driven in the Xfinity Series and the Cup Series.

References

Populated places in the Pine Barrens (New Jersey)
Stafford Township, New Jersey
Unincorporated communities in Ocean County, New Jersey
Unincorporated communities in New Jersey